Colchagua is a Chilean village located in San Rosendo, Bío Bío Province, Bío Bío Region. It is located close to the historic town of Rere and the Estación Buenuraqui railway station.

References

Populated places in Bío Bío Province